This is a list of German television related events from 2007.

Events
8 March - Roger Cicero is selected to represent Germany at the 2007 Eurovision Song Contest with his song "Frauen regier'n die Welt". He is selected to be the fifty-second German Eurovision entry during Wer singt für Deutschland? held at the Deutsches Schauspielhaus in Hamburg.
5 May - Mark Medlock wins the fourth season of Deutschland sucht den Superstar.
30 June - Gute Zeiten, schlechte Zeiten actress Susan Sideropoulos and her partner Christian Polanc win the second season of Let's Dance.
7 July - Michael Carstensen wins the seventh season of Big Brother Germany.
3 November - 19-year-old opera singer Ricardo Marinello wins the first season of Das Supertalent.

Debuts

Domestic
8 January - Afrika, mon amour (2007) (ZDF)
16 January - 2030 – Aufstand der Alten (2007) (ZDF)
20 October - Das Supertalent (2007–present) (RTL)

International
20 January -  Foster's Home for Imaginary Friends (2004–2009) (Super RTL)

Military Television

Military Television Debuts

American Forces Network
6 March -  Slangman's World (2007–2008)

BFBS
 The Likeaballs (2006)
 The Beeps (2007–2008)
 Shaun the Sheep (2007–2016)

Television shows

1950s
Tagesschau (1952–present)

1960s
 heute (1963-present)

1970s
 heute-journal (1978-present)
 Tagesthemen (1978-present)

1980s
Wetten, dass..? (1981-2014)
Lindenstraße (1985–present)

1990s
Gute Zeiten, schlechte Zeiten (1992–present)
Marienhof (1992–2011)
Unter uns (1994-present)
Verbotene Liebe (1995-2015)
Schloss Einstein (1998–present)
In aller Freundschaft (1998–present)
Wer wird Millionär? (1999-present)

2000s
Big Brother Germany (2000-2011, 2015–present)
Deutschland sucht den Superstar (2002–present)
Let's Dance (2006–present)

Ending this year

Births

Deaths

See also 
2007 in Germany